Eshqabad (also Romanized as ‘Eshqābād; also known as Ba‘eshqābād and Ba‘ishqābād) is a village in Chaleh Tarkhan Rural District, Qaleh Now District, Ray County, Tehran Province, Iran. At the 2006 census, its population was 917, in 216 families.

References 

Populated places in Ray County, Iran